D50 state road, located mainly in Lika region of Croatia connecting cities and towns of Korenica, Gospić and Karlobag, to the state road network of Croatia, and most notably to D1 and D8 state roads and the A1 motorway Gospić interchange (via D534 state road). The route comprises a significant number of urban intersections, in segment of the road running through Gospić.

The D25 and D50 state roads are concurrent in a segment between Lički Osik and Gospić.

The road, as well as all other state roads in Croatia, is managed and maintained by Hrvatske ceste, a state-owned company.

Traffic volume 

Traffic is regularly counted and reported by Hrvatske ceste, operator of the road.  Substantial variations between annual (AADT) and summer (ASDT) traffic volumes at some counting sites, especially those between Karlobag and Gospić, are attributed to the fact that the road connects to D8 state road which in turn provides connections to the Adriatic coast resorts.

Road junctions and populated areas

See also
 Highways in Croatia

Maps

Sources

D025
D025